Mike Ricci (born March 18, 1986) is a Canadian mixed martial artist who competed for the Ultimate Fighting Championship and has also fought in Bellator MMA.

Mixed martial arts career

Bellator Fighting Championships
It was announced that Ricci would be a participant in Bellator Fighting Championships Season 2 Lightweight Tournament. His first round match-up was against Pat Curran the fight took place at Bellator 14 in Chicago, Illinois, a little more than midway through the round, Curran connected on a powerful right hook that sent Ricci crashing to the mat where he stayed unconscious for a few minutes after a few follow up punches. The bout was stopped, and Curran won via KO in the first round.

The Ultimate Fighter
Ricci joined the cast of The Ultimate Fighter: Team Carwin vs. Team Nelson as part of Team Carwin. In his first fight Ricci defeated Dom Waters via unanimous decision in the first round of the tournament. Following his first round victory Ricci went on to fight fellow Canadian Michael Hill in the quarterfinals of the tournament winning via unanimous decision. Ricci went on to defeat Neil Magny in the semifinals winning via knockout in the first round and also winning Knockout of the Season.

Ultimate Fighting Championship
Ricci was defeated by Colton Smith via unanimous decision on December 15, 2012, at The Ultimate Fighter: Team Carwin vs. Team Nelson Finale.

For his second UFC fight, Ricci returned to lightweight division. He defeated Colin Fletcher via unanimous decision on March 16, 2013, at UFC 158.

Ricci next faced Myles Jury on September 21, 2013, at UFC 165. He lost the fight via split decision.  His release from the UFC was subsequently announced on the internet and social network sites on Friday, September 27, 2013.

Titan Fighting Championship
Ricci made his Titan Fighting Championships debut against former Strikeforce and UFC fighter Jorge Gurgel on February 28, 2014, at Titan FC 27. He won via TKO due to punches and elbows in the first round.

Ricci was expected to face George Sotiropoulos at Titan Fighting Championship 28 on April 25, 2014, however Ricci suffered an injury and the fight was rescheduled for August 22, 2014, at Titan FC 29. He won the fight via unanimous decision.

Ricci was expected to face Yoshiyuki Yoshida for the vacant Titan FC Lightweight Championship at Titan FC 31 on October 31, 2014. Prior to the fight, Ricci failed to make weight. Both men agreed to fight in a non-title 157 lb catchweight fight instead, but it was ultimately cancelled due to Yoshida refusing to fight just hours before the event.

World Series of Fighting
On August 18, 2015, it was announced that Ricci signed with the World Series of Fighting.

Ricci made his WSOF debut on November 20, 2015, at WSOF 25 in a one night only eight man Lightweight tournament to determine a number one contender for the WSOF Lightweight Championship. He was set to face fellow UFC veteran Brian Cobb in the quarterfinal bout but Cobb was replaced by Joe Condon. Ricci won via knockout due to a head kick in the first round.  However, Ricci suffered a hip injury and was replaced in the tournament for his quarterfinal bout.

On December 18, 2015, it was announced that Ricci will fight in the co-main event at WSOF 27 on January 23, 2016, against Caros Fodor. Ricci was later replaced by Luiz Firmino at this event due to an injury.

On March 23, 2016, it was announced that Ricci will fight in the co-main event at WSOF 31 on June 17, 2016, against Strikeforce and UFC vet Jason High. He lost via technical knockout in the second round.

Championships and accomplishments
Ultimate Fighting Championship
The Ultimate Fighter 16 Knockout of the Season

Mixed martial arts record

|-
|Loss
|align=center|11–5
|Jason High
|TKO (punches)
|WSOF 31
|
|align=center|2
|align=center|4:08
|Mashantucket, Connecticut, United States
|
|-
|Win
|align=center|11–4
|Joe Condon
|KO (head kick)
|WSOF 25
|
|align=center|1
|align=center|2:41
|Phoenix, Arizona, United States
|
|-
|Win
|align=center|10–4
| George Sotiropoulos
|Decision (unanimous)
|Titan FC 29
|
|align=center|3
|align=center|5:00
|Fayetteville, North Carolina, United States
|  
|-
|Win
|align=center|9–4
| Jorge Gurgel
|TKO (punches and elbows)
|Titan FC 27
|
|align=center|1
|align=center|3:57
|Kansas City, Kansas, United States
|
|-
|Loss
|align=center|8–4
| Myles Jury
|Decision (split)
|UFC 165
|
|align=center|3
|align=center|5:00
|Toronto, Ontario, Canada
|
|-
|Win
|align=center|8–3
| Colin Fletcher
|Decision (unanimous)
|UFC 158
|
|align=center|3
|align=center|5:00 
|Montreal, Quebec, Canada
|
|-
|Loss
|align=center|7–3
| Colton Smith
|Decision (unanimous)
|The Ultimate Fighter 16 Finale
|
|align=center|3
|align=center|5:00
|Las Vegas, Nevada, United States
|
|-
|Win
|align=center|7–2
| Tony Hervey
|Decision (unanimous)
|Ringside MMA 13 
|
|align=center|3
|align=center|5:00
|Montreal, Quebec, Canada
|
|-
|Loss
|align=center|6–2
| Daron Cruickshank
|Decision (unanimous)
|Ringside MMA 12 
|
|align=center|3
|align=center|5:00
|Montreal, Quebec, Canada
|
|-
|Win
|align=center|6–1
| Jesse Ronson
|TKO (punches)
|Ringside MMA 10 
|
|align=center|1
|align=center|3:12
|Montreal, Quebec, Canada
|
|-
|Loss
|align=center|5–1
| Pat Curran
|KO (punch)
|Bellator 14
|
|align=center|1
|align=center|3:01
|Chicago, Illinois, United States
|
|-
|Win
|align=center|5–0
| Jordan Mein
|Decision (unanimous)
|Ringside MMA 4
|
|align=center|3
|align=center|5:00
|Drummondville, Quebec, Canada
|
|-
|Win
|align=center|4–0
| Jean-Marc Lalonde
|TKO (punches)
|Ringside MMA 1
|
|align=center|1
|align=center|2:35
|Montreal, Quebec, Canada
|
|-
|Win
|align=center|3–0
| Rory McDonell
|TKO (body kick)
|XMMA 6 - House of Pain
|
|align=center|2
|align=center|2:15
|Montreal, Quebec, Canada
|
|-
|Win
|align=center|2–0
| Reza Kamali
|Submission (rear-naked choke)
|TKO MMA 35
|
|align=center|1
|align=center|3:41
|Montreal, Quebec, Canada
|
|-
|Win
|align=center|1–0
| Stephane Chretien
|TKO (punches)
|TKO MMA 34
|
|align=center|3
|align=center|4:58
|Montreal, Quebec, Canada
|

Mixed martial arts exhibition record

|-
|Win
|align=center|4–0
| Neil Magny
| KO (elbow)
| The Ultimate Fighter: Team Carwin vs. Team Nelson
| (airdate)
|align=center|1
|align=center|4:12
|Las Vegas, Nevada, United States
|
|-
|Win
|align=center|3–0
| Michael Hill
| Decision (unanimous)
| The Ultimate Fighter: Team Carwin vs. Team Nelson
| (airdate)
|align=center|2
|align=center|5:00
|Las Vegas, Nevada, United States
|
|-
|Win
|align=center|2–0
| Dom Waters
| Decision (unanimous) 
| The Ultimate Fighter: Team Carwin vs. Team Nelson
| (airdate)
|align=center|3
|align=center|5:00
|Las Vegas, Nevada, United States
|
|-
|Win
|align=center|1–0
| Jason South
| TKO (punches) 
| The Ultimate Fighter: Team Carwin vs. Team Nelson
| (airdate)
|align=center|1
|align=center|1:50
|Las Vegas, Nevada, United States
|
|-

References

External links
 
 

1986 births
Canadian male kickboxers
Canadian male mixed martial artists
Canadian people of Italian descent
Living people
Sportspeople from Montreal
Ultimate Fighting Championship male fighters
Canadian practitioners of Brazilian jiu-jitsu